George Ralph Campbell Abercromby, 3rd Baron Abercromby (30 May 1800 – 25 June 1852) was a Scottish soldier, politician and peer. The son of George Abercromby, 2nd Baron Abercromby and Montague Dundas, on his death in 1852 he was succeeded in the barony by his eldest son.

Career
He was commissioned into the 51st Foot. In 1817 he purchased a lieutenancy in the 3rd Foot Guards and in 1818 exchanged into the 3rd Dragoon Guards as a cornet. In 1821 he purchased a lieutenancy in the regiment and in 1822 he purchased a captaincy in the 12th Light Dragoons. By 1828 he was back in the 3rd Dragoon Guards as a major and in that year he purchased an unattached infantry Lieutenant-colonelcy. By 1842 he was a colonel and in that year he exchanged into the Coldstream Guards as a lieutenant-colonel. On the death of his father on 15 February 1843 he succeeded to the title of 3rd Baron Abercromby.

He was a Whig Member of Parliament for Clackmannanshire, 1824–26 and 1830–1831; for Stirlingshire, 1838–1841; and for Clackmannanshire and Kinross-shire, 1841–1842. He was Lord Lieutenant of Clackmannanshire, 1840–1852.

On his death, he was buried at Tullibody.

Family
He married Louisa Penuel Forbes, daughter of John Hay Forbes, Lord Medwyn and Louisa Cumming-Gordon, on 3 April 1832 and had issue:
Montague Abercromby (1835–1931), married George Boyle, 6th Earl of Glasgow (1856)
George Ralph Campbell Abercromby, 4th Baron Abercromby (1838–1917)
John Abercromby, 5th Baron Abercromby (1841–1924)
Lt. Ralph Abercromby (1842–1897)

References
thePeerage.com

External links
 

1800 births
1852 deaths
George
3
King's Own Yorkshire Light Infantry officers
Lord-Lieutenants of Clackmannanshire
Scots Guards officers
Eldest sons of British hereditary barons
3rd Dragoon Guards officers
12th Royal Lancers officers
Coldstream Guards officers
Members of the Parliament of the United Kingdom for Scottish constituencies
UK MPs 1820–1826
UK MPs 1830–1831
UK MPs 1837–1841
UK MPs 1841–1847
UK MPs who inherited peerages